The 1958–59 DFB-Pokal was the 16th season of the annual German football cup competition. It began on 3 October 1959 and ended on 27 December 1959. Four teams competed in the tournament of two rounds. In the final Schwarz-Weiß Essen defeated Borussia Neunkirchen 5 – 2.

Matches

Qualification round

Semi-finals

Final

References

External links
 Official site of the DFB 
 Kicker.de 
 1959 results at Fussballdaten.de 
 Chronicle of Schwarz-Weiß Essen with much information about the 1959 Cup final

1958-59
1958–59 in German football cups